Sam is a surname. Notable people with the name include:

Alfred Sam (c.1880–1930s), Gold Coast trader and Back-to-Africa pioneer
 Christian Sam (born 1996), American football player
 Eliza Sam or Cen Lixiang (born 1984), Chinese-Canadian actress
 Leman Sam (born 1951), Turkish singer and songwriter
 Michael Sam (born 1990), American gridiron football player
 P. K. Sam (born 1983), American gridiron football player
 Şevval Sam (born 1973), Turkish singer and actress
 Tirésias Simon Sam (1835–1916), Haitian politician, President of Haiti 1896–1902
 Tony Sam, American stand-up comedian
 Vilbrun Guillaume Sam (1859–1915), Haitian politician, President of Haiti 1915

Cantonese
 Cen (surname) (岑), romanized "Sam" in Cantonese
 Shen (surname) (沈), often romanized "Sam" in Cantonese

See also
 Sam (given name)
 Sam (disambiguation)

Surnames of Cambodian origin
Khmer-language surnames